With or Without You is a 2003 comedy drama film directed by G. Stubbs and starring Cynda Williams, Victor Williams, Mushond Lee, and Wendy Raquel Robinson.  The film was produced by Anita M. Cal and Lisa Diane Washington in Los Angeles, CA.

Plot
Robert's (Lee) life has been going just the way he wanted it to, from both a professional and personal standpoint. That is until his girlfriend Cheri (Williams) tells him she's expecting. While she feels they should get married, Robert still isn't quite sure if he's ready to take such a major step in his life. He tries to get advice from his friends, who all (besides not being married or in any sort of exclusive relationships of their own) basically tell him to stand firm in his decision if he doesn't feel he's ready. Cheri also has a group of friends however, and they are just as much in support of her opinion that the two should be looking to settle down as Robert's friends are of his. When they all get together to celebrate the baby shower, tensions inevitably flare, and a few unexpected secrets finally come to light, leading to a frothy and mirthful climax.

Cast
Cynda Williams — Cheri Fontenot
Mushond Lee — Robert Hightower
Dannon Green — Cousin Jacque
Guy Torry — Greg
J.B. Smoove — Darnell
Maia Campbell — Teresa
Maria de Los Angeles — Maria
Maurice Smith — Lee
Nicki Micheaux — Rochelle
James "Talent" Harris — Eddie
Victor Williams — Kenneth
Wendy Raquel Robinson — Serena

External links
 
 

2003 films
African-American films
2003 comedy-drama films
American comedy-drama films
2000s English-language films
2000s American films